"Jag mår illa" (in English: "I Feel Sick") is a song written by Swedish artist, composer and actor Magnus Uggla and Anders Henriksson, and recorded by Magnus Uggla for his 1989 album 35-åringen. With lyrics satirizing celebrity culture and gossip magazines, the song reached Svensktoppen on 17 September 1989, peaking at number nine on the Norwegian singles chart, while topping the Swedish singles chart. Uggla wrote the song for a screenplay of a film that was never produced. Swedish radio program Metropol appointed the song "Best Swedish song of the 1980s".

Charts

References

1989 songs
1989 singles
Magnus Uggla songs
Number-one singles in Sweden
Songs written by Magnus Uggla
Songs written by Anders Henriksson (record producer)
Swedish-language songs